Livonian Chronicle may refer to one of the following chronicles.

Livonian Rhymed Chronicle
By anonymous (1180–1290)
By Bartholomäus Hoeneke (1340s)
Chronicle of Henry of Livonia (1220s)
By Hermann de Wartberge (up to 1378)
By Hermann Helewegh (15th century)
By Balthasar Russow (1578)
By Johann Renner (1582)
By Franz Nyenstede (1609)